Yuri Khatuevich Temirkanov (born December 10, 1938) is a Russian conductor of Circassian (Kabardian) origin.

Early life
Born in 1938 in the North Caucasus city of Nalchik, Temirkanov attended the Leningrad School for Talented Children where he continued his studies in violin and viola.

Career
In 1968, he was appointed Principal Conductor of the then-renamed Leningrad Symphony where he remained until his appointment as Music Director of the Kirov Opera and Ballet in 1976.

Temirkanov was the first Soviet artist permitted to perform in the United States after cultural relations were resumed with the Soviet Union at the end of the Soviet–Afghan War in 1988.

Temirkanov became artistic director and chief conductor of the St. Petersburg Philharmonic in 1988.  He was music director of the Baltimore Symphony Orchestra from 2000 until 2006.  He has served as principal guest conductor of the Danish National Symphony Orchestra and conductor laureate of the Royal Philharmonic Orchestra in London. In 2015, the Teatro La Fenice awarded Temirkanov its prize 'A Life for Music' (unofficially known as the Nobel Prize for Musicians).

Honors and awards
State Prize of the Russian Federation in Literature and Art in 1998 (4 June 1999) – for concert programs 1995–1998 Academic Symphony Orchestra, St. Petersburg Philharmonic Society named after Shostakovich
Russian Federation President Prize in Literature and Art in 2002 (13 February 2003)
The 6432 Temirkanov asteroid was named after the conductor (1975)
 Order of the Rising Sun, 3rd Class, Gold Rays with Neck Ribbon (2015)

Controversy
Temirkanov has drawn attention for saying that women are essentially weak and thus not well suited to be classical conductors. In 2016, he said:

 "Yes, women can be conductors. I am not against them conducting. But I simply don't like it."

References

External links
Interview with Yuri Temirkanov, July 17, 1997

1938 births
Living people
Musicians from Nalchik
Circassian people of Russia
Russian classical violists
Full Cavaliers of the Order "For Merit to the Fatherland"
Recipients of the Order of Lenin
People's Artists of the USSR
People's Artists of Russia
State Prize of the Russian Federation laureates
Recipients of the USSR State Prize
Glinka State Prize of the RSFSR winners
Soviet conductors (music)
20th-century Russian conductors (music)
Russian male conductors (music)
20th-century Russian male musicians
20th-century classical musicians
21st-century Russian conductors (music)
21st-century Russian male musicians
20th-century violists
21st-century violists